The Zopheridae family of beetles has grown considerably in recent years as the members of two other families have been included within its circumscription; these former families are the Monommatidae and the Colydiidae, which are now both included in the Zopheridae as subfamilies or (in the former case) even as tribe of subfamily Zopherinae. Some authors accept up to six subfamilies here, while others merge all except the Colydiinae into the Zopherinae.

The family has approximately 190 genera and 1700 species, which are found worldwide. A large number of members of the family feed on rotting wood or fungus associated with rotting wood, though some members of Colydiinae are predatory, or feed on living plant tissue such as roots, stems, flower stalks and fruit.

The oldest fossils of the family are Paleoendeitoma (subfamily Colydiinae, tribe Synchitini) and Cretomysteria from the early Late Cretaceous (Cenomanian) Burmese amber from Myanmar.

See also
List of subgroups of the order Coleoptera

Genera
These 89 genera belong to the family Zopheridae:

 Ablabus Broun, 1880 g
 Acolobicus Sharp, 1894 i c g b
 Acropis Burmeister, 1840 g
 Anarmostes Pascoe, 1860 g
 Anchomma Leconte, 1858 g
 Antilissus Sharp, 1879 i c g
 Aspathines Champion, 1888 i c g b
 Aulonium Erichson, 1845 i c g b
 Bitoma Herbst, 1793 i c g b
 Catolaemus Sharp, 1894 g
 Cerchanotus Erichson, 1845 g
 Chorasus Sharp, 1882 g
 Cicones Curtis, 1827 g
 Colobicones Grouvelle, 1918 g
 Colobicus Latreille, 1807 i c g b
 Colydium Fabricius, 1792 i c g b
 Colydodes Motschulsky, 1855 g
 Corticus Germar, 1824 g
 Coxelus Dejean, 1821 i c g b
 Denophoelus Stephan, 1989 i c g b
 Diodesma Latreille, 1829 g
 Diplagia Reitter, 1882 g
 Dryptops Broun, 1882 g
 Endeitoma Sharp, 1894 i c g b
 Endocoxelus Waterhouse, 1876 g
 Endophloeus Dejean, 1834 g
 Enhypnon Carter, 1919 g
 Ethelema Pascoe, 1860 g
 Eucicones Sharp, 1894 i c g b
 Eudesma LeConte, 1863 i c g b
 Glyphocryptus Sharp, 1885 g
 Helioctamenus Schaufuss, 1882 g
 Hyporhagus Thomson, 1860 i c g b
 Hyporrhagus Thomson, 1860 g
 Inscutomonomma Pic, 1951 g
 Langelandia Aubé, 1842 g
 Lasconotus Erichson, 1845 i c g b
 Lemnis Harold, 1868 g
 Lobogestoria Reitter, 1878 i c g b
 Lyreus Aubé, 1861 i c g b
 Mecedanum Erichson, 1845 g
 Megataphrus Casey, 1890 i c g b
 Microprius Fairmaire, 1868 i c g b
 Microsicus Sharp, 1894 i c g
 Monoedus Horn, 1882 i c g b
 Monomma Klug, 1833 g
 Myrmechixenus g
 Namunaria Reitter, 1882 i c g b
 Nematidium Erichson, 1845 i c g b
 Neotrichus Sharp, 1886 i c g
 Noserinus Casey, 1907 g
 Noserus g
 Nosoderma Solier, 1841 g
 Nosodomodes Reitter, 1922 g
 Orthocerus g
 Paha Dajoz, 1984 i c g b
 Phellopsis LeConte, 1862 i c g b
 Phloeodalis Erichson, 1845 g
 Phloeodes LeConte, 1862 i c g b
 Phloeonemus Erichson, 1845 i c g b
 Phormesa Pascoe, 1863 g
 Phreatus Pascoe, 1863 g
 Priolomus Erichson, 1845 g
 Pristoderus Hope, 1840 g
 Prosteca Wollaston, 1860 g
 Prostheca Wollaston, 1860 g
 Pseudaulonium Reitter, 1877 g
 Pseudendestes Lawrence, 1980 g
 Pseudocorticus Hinton, 1935 i c g b
 Pycnomerus Erichson, 1842 i c g b
 Rechodes Erichson, 1845 g
 Recyntus Broun, 1882 g
 Rhagodera Mannerheim, 1843 i c g b
 Rhagoderidea Wickham, 1914 g
 Rhizonium Sharp, 1876 g
 Sesaspis b
 Spinhyporhagus Freude, 1984 i c g
 Stephaniolus Ivie, Slipinsky and Wegrzynowicz, 2001 i c g
 Synchita Hellwig, 1792 i c g b
 Tarphiablabus Slipinski & Lawrence, 1997 g
 Tarphiosoma Wollaston, 1862 g
 Tarphius Erichson, 1845 g
 Todimopsis Slipinski & Lawrence, 1997 g
 Trigonophloeus Dajoz, 1980 g
 Usechimorpha Blaisdell, 1929 i c g b
 Usechus Motschulsky, 1845 i c g b
 Vitiacus Broun, 1893 g
 Xylolaemus Dejean, 1835 g
 Zopherus Laporte, 1840 i c g b

Data sources: i = ITIS, c = Catalogue of Life, g = GBIF, b = Bugguide.net

References

 
Beetle families
Tenebrionoidea